Sherry Just (born June 17, 1986) is a Canadian curler from Prince Albert, Saskatchewan. She currently plays second on Team Robyn Silvernagle.

Career

Women's
Just began competing on the World Curling Tour during the 2010–11 season. After the season, she moved to Saskatchewan. She qualified for the playoffs at the 2012 DEKALB Superspiel, losing in the quarterfinals. She also played in the Colonial Square Ladies Classic Grand Slam of Curling event in 2013 and 2014 but failed to qualify on both occasions.

She played in her first Saskatchewan Scotties Tournament of Hearts in 2016 as second for Nancy Martin. They finished 1–4, failing to advance. She returned the following season, playing third for Brett Barber. After going 4–4 through the round robin, they lost the tiebreaker to eventual winners Penny Barker. Some of her notable finishes on tour include semifinal finishes at the 2017 Boundary Ford Curling Classic and the 2018 Medicine Hat Charity Classic. At the 2019 Saskatchewan Scotties Tournament of Hearts, she skipped her own team to a 4–4 finish.

Mixed doubles
Aside from her women's team, Just also plays Mixed doubles curling. In 2016, she played with Derek Samagalski at the 2016 Canadian Mixed Doubles Curling Trials, finishing 3–4. She played with Ryan Deis at the 2017 and 2018 Canadian Mixed Doubles Curling Championship, reaching the quarterfinals in 2017. She also played with Tyrel Griffith at the 2018 Canadian Mixed Doubles Curling Olympic Trials, going 3–5.

Personal life
Just is employed as the executive director and occupational therapist at the Saskatchewan Society of Occupational Therapists. She studied at the University of Manitoba.

Teams

References

External links

1986 births
Canadian women curlers
Curlers from Saskatchewan
Living people
Sportspeople from Prince Albert, Saskatchewan
Curlers from Winnipeg
University of Manitoba alumni
21st-century Canadian women